Upplandiops is an extinct genus of trilobite in the family Pterygometopidae. There is one described species in Upplandiops, U. calvus.

References

Pterygometopidae
Articles created by Qbugbot